A closed community intentionally limits links with outsiders and outside communities. Closed communities may be of a religious, ethnic, or political nature. Governance of closed societies varies. Typically, members of closed communities are either born into the community or are accepted into it. The opposite of a closed community is an open community, which maintains social relations with external communities.

Development 

Frederic Clements was an American ecologist and pioneer who studied vegetation formation and development, he created the idea that plants are supposed to birth, grow/mature, and decay. Their life cycle is similar to that of a human being. Clements also tested a theory known as "climax community"; he used areas of vegetation in comparison to actual communities. The community (fauna or human) is always constant and thriving, even if there were to be a catastrophic event, an individual or small group can manage to survive and regrow or rebuild in the same area they originated or relocate elsewhere and succeed. The concept of many plants and animals coexisting together, having an ecosystem and building upwards was the theory he aimed for (example: rain forest). The general theory later failed due to the fact that there was little or extremely basic comparable information about the logic of a being, the concept worked more in favor towards smaller organisms. Also, the theory became outdated and later on replaced with new sociological facts or science theories.

Pros 
 Security of residing in a controlled/supervised area
 Easier to find common interest, idea development with someone in your community
 Being able to finish work more efficiently, naturally, and more originally due to having no interference with exterior

Cons 
 Limitation and "cut-off" of diversity which leads to more difficulty accepting or incorporating outside concepts
 Constantly having the same people in a closed area within a large communities of 50 or more can cause a resident to feel overwhelmed with an urge to escape
 The fear of being overpowered or intimidation/competition
 Can close themselves so off from advancements that have a hard time reintegrating into society

In a 1957 article published in the Southwestern Journal of Anthropology, archaeologist Eric R. Wolf argued that the organization of subsistence farmers into "closed, corporate communities" is a recurrent feature "in two world areas, widely separated by past history and geographical space: Mesoamerica and Central Java."

Medicine in closed communities
Infectious disease presents particular challenges to closed communities; external action (from the government or outside medical personnel) may assist in stopping the spread of the disease.

Religious and cultural communities 

Some religious or ethnoreligious communities are considered closed. For example:

The Amish are regarded as closed community; the Amish intentionally set themselves apart from the modern world.
Since the 11th century, the Druze have been a closed community.

Closed countries

Examples of closed countries 

 Japan (formerly) – under the Sakoku policy of the Edo period, Japan secluded itself from Western influences, controlling contract.
 North Korea - see also North Korean defectors. Often regarded as the world's most secretive state. 
 Soviet Union - Soviet diplomat Anatoly Dobrynin wrote in his memoirs: "In the closed society of the Soviet Union, the Kremlin was afraid of emigration in general (irrespective of nationality or religion)" for fear of causing domestic instability.
 See also Refusenik
 "closed cities" — secretive, specially controlled zones that contained nuclear reactors and other sensitive facilities continue to exist in Russia today.
 Burma (Myanmar) - formerly a closed society and international pariah, Burma underwent political reforms beginning in 2011 that made its society more open.
 Eritrea - Human Rights Watch has described Eritrea as one of the world's most closed countries. Eritrea has a closed, militarized, and heavily fortified border with Ethiopia, its regional rival with which tensions are high.

Further reading
"Anatomy: World's Most Isolated Countries". World Policy Journal 30.1 (2013): 22–23. 
Reiff, Joseph T. Born of Conviction: White Methodists and Mississippi's Closed Society. Oxford University Press, 2016. 
Erler, Mary Carpenter. Reading and Writing during the Dissolution: Monks, Friars, and Nuns 1530–1558. Cambridge University Press, 2013. 
Kinkead, Gwen. Chinatown: A Portrait of a Closed Society. HarperCollins Publishers, 1992
Gibney, Mark. Open Borders? Closed Societies?: The Ethical and Political Issues. Greenwood, 1988.
Nakhimovsky, Isaac. The Closed Commercial State: Perpetual Peace and Commercial Society from Rousseau to Fichte. Princeton University Press ,2011.
Symbol and Meaning Beyond the Closed Community: Essays in Mesoamerican Ideas (ed. Gary H. Gossen: University Press of Colorado, 1986.
Gontier, Thierry. "Open and Closed Societies: Voegelin as Reader of Bergson". Politics, Religion & Ideology 16.1 (2015): 23–38. Web.

See also
 Gated community
 Capital controls
 Human capital flight

References

External links
 Vellend, Mark (23 May 2012). "Ecology The Community Concept". Oxford Bibliographies Online.

Community building